Reiab (also Romanized as Rīāb) is a village in Howmeh Rural District, in the Central District of Gonabad County, Razavi Khorasan Province, Iran. At the 2006 census, its population was 623, in 198 families.

References 

Populated places in Gonabad County